John Lewis was an American politician and civil rights leader from Georgia.

John Lewis may also refer to:

People

Academics 
 John Lewis (computer scientist) (born 1963), American computer science educator and author
 John Lewis (headmaster) (born 1942), New Zealand headmaster of Eton College
 John Lewis (philosopher) (1889–1976), British Unitarian minister and Marxist philosopher
 John David Lewis (1955–2012), American political scientist, historian, and Objectivist scholar
 John S. Lewis (born 1941), American professor of planetary science at the University of Arizona's Lunar and Planetary Laboratory
 John T. Lewis (1932–2004), Welsh mathematical physicist
 John Wilson Lewis (1930–2017), American political scientist

Businesspeople 
 John Lewis (brewer) (1713–1792), British brewer
 John Lewis (department store founder) (1836–1928), British draper and founder of the John Lewis department store
 John Spedan Lewis (1885–1963), British industrial democracy pioneer, founder of the John Lewis Partnership
 Sir John Lewis (businessman), British businessman, solicitor and charity executive
 John Allen Lewis (1819–1895), American newspaper editor

Clergy 
 John Lewis (antiquarian) (1675–1747), English clergyman
 John Lewis (archbishop of Ontario) (1825–1901), Anglican bishop, archbishop and author in Canada
 John Lewis (archdeacon of Cheltenham) (born 1934), British Anglican priest
 John Lewis (archdeacon of Hereford) (1909–1984), Anglican priest
 John Lewis (archdeacon of North-West Europe) (1939–1994), Archdeacon of North West Europe from 1982 to 1993
 John Lewis (bishop of North Queensland) (1926–2015), Australian Anglican bishop
 John Lewis (dean of Llandaff) (born 1947), Welsh Anglican priest
 John Lewis (dean of Ossory) (1717–1783), Dean of Ossory in Ireland from 1755 to 1783

Musicians 
 John Lewis (electronic musician) (died 1984), Canadian-British electronic music composer
 John Lewis (pianist) (1920–2001), American jazz pianist and composer with the Modern Jazz Quartet
 John Lewis (singer) (born 1947), British singer and multi-instrumentalist known professionally as Jona Lewie

Politicians

American politicians 
 John Lewis (1940–2020), member of US House of Representatives from Georgia 
 John Lewis (Arizona politician) (born 1957), businessman and mayor of Gilbert, Arizona
 John Lewis (California politician) (born 1954), politician in the California Senate
 John L. Lewis (politician) (1800–1886), mayor of New Orleans
 John Wood Lewis Sr. (1801–1865), Confederate States of America Senator
 John Lewis (Shawnee leader) ( – 1826), Native American leader of the Shawnee in Lewistown, Ohio
 John F. Lewis (1818–1895), US Senator from Virginia
 John H. Lewis (1830–1929), US Representative from Illinois
 John W. Lewis (1841–1913), US Representative from Kentucky
 John W. Lewis Jr. (1906–1977), Illinois Secretary of State
 John W. Lewis III (born 1949), politician in Florida

Australian politicians 
 John Lewis (Australian politician) (1844–1923), South Australian pastoralist and politician

British politicians 
 John Lewis (of Abernant) (1580–?), Welsh MP
 John Lewis (Radnor MP) (1738–1797), Welsh MP for New Radnor
 Harvey Lewis (politician) (John Harvey Lewis, 1814–1888), Irish-born lawyer and Liberal MP
 John Delaware Lewis (1828–1884), English Liberal Party MP
 J. H. Lewis (John H. Lewis, 1908–1976), English landowner and councillor
 John Lewis (British politician) (1912–1969), British Labour Party MP

Canadian politicians 
 John Lewis (Canadian senator) (1858–1935), newspaper editor and senator
 John Lewis (New Brunswick politician) (1804–?), judge and politician
 John Lewis (Newfoundland politician) (1867–1922), politician in Newfoundland
 John Bower Lewis (1817–1874), politician in Ottawa

Sportspeople 
 John Lewis (cricketer) (1867–1939), Australian cricketer
 John Lewis (footballer, born 1881) (1881–1954), Welsh international football player
 John Lewis (footballer, born 1949), Australian rules footballer for Hawthorn
 John Lewis (footballer, born 1953), Australian rules footballer for Fitzroy
 John Lewis (footballer, born 1954), English football player for Orient
 John Lewis (footballer, born 1955), Welsh football player and manager
 John Lewis (referee) (1855–1926), English football player, administrator, referee and co-founder of Blackburn Rovers F.C.
 John Lewis (weightlifter) (born 1943), Canadian Olympic weightlifter
 John Goulstone Lewis (1859–1935), Welsh international rugby union player
 John Henry Lewis (1914–1974), American boxer and world light heavyweight champion
 Buddy Lewis (John Kelly Lewis, 1916–2011), American baseball player

Other people 
 John Lewis (1678–1762), Virginia pioneer and father of General Andrew Lewis and Thomas Lewis
 John Lewis (criminal) (died 1910), American gangster from New York City, known as Spanish Louie
 John Lewis (journalist) (born 1933), Australian journalist
 John Lewis (Nebraska activist) (1841–?), hotelier, musician, and civil rights activist in Omaha, Nebraska
 John Lewis (typographer) (1912–1996), British typographer and illustrator
 John Frederick Lewis (1805–1876), English Orientalist painter
 John L. Lewis (1880–1969), American labor leader
 John P. Lewis (1921–2010), American academic and presidential advisor
 John Percy Leon Lewis (1943–2020), Guyanese military officer
 John Randolph Lewis (1834–1900), American dentist, soldier, administrator, and postmaster
 John Taylor Lewis (1894–1983), American army officer
 F. John Lewis, American surgeon

Other 
 John Lewis & Partners, a chain of department stores in the United Kingdom
 John Lewis Partnership, a United Kingdom employee-owned retailer
 USNS John Lewis (T-AO-205), lead ship of a class of US military tankers

See also
 Lenell John-Lewis (born 1989), English footballer
 Jack Lewis (disambiguation)
 John R. Lewis (disambiguation)
 Johnny Lewis (disambiguation)
 Jon Lewis (disambiguation)
 Jonathan Lewis (disambiguation)
 John Louis (disambiguation)